Walter Hepworth (4 October 1878 – 1965) was an English professional footballer who scored 9 goals from 26 appearances in the Football League playing at inside right for Barnsley. He had two sons who played league football: Arthur played for Nelson in the late 1920s and Ronnie made more than 100 appearances for Bradford (Park Avenue) in the years following the Second World War.

References

1878 births
1965 deaths
Footballers from Barnsley
English footballers
Association football inside forwards
Barnsley F.C. players
English Football League players